Zoran Milekić (born 1955) is a politician in Serbia. He was president of the municipality (i.e. mayor) of Kučevo from 2004 to 2016 and has served in the National Assembly of Serbia since 2014 as a member of the Serbian Progressive Party.

Private career
Milekić is a civil technician based in Kučevo.

Political career
Milekić began his political career as a member of the far-right Serbian Radical Party but switched to the more centrist Progressives following a party split in 2008. He became mayor of Kučevo via a direct election in 2004 and was returned to the position following the municipal assembly elections of 2008 and 2012. He continues to serve as a member of the Kučevo municipal assembly as of 2018.

Milekić received the 103rd position on the Progressive Party's Aleksandar Vučić — Future We Believe In electoral list in the 2014 Serbian parliamentary election and was elected when the list won a landslide victory with 158 out of 250 mandates. He received the same position in the 2016 election and was re-elected when the list won a second consecutive majority with 131 mandates. Milekić is currently a member of the parliamentary committee on spatial planning, transport, infrastructure, and telecommunications, and a member Serbia's parliamentary friendship group with Russia.

References

1955 births
Living people
People from Kučevo
Mayors of places in Serbia
Members of the National Assembly (Serbia)
Serbian Radical Party politicians
Serbian Progressive Party politicians